Louise Adeline Weitzel (December 2, 1862 – May 6, 1934) was an American writer of German descent. She was born in Green Bay, Wisconsin. Her family moved to Lititz, Pennsylvania while she was still young.

Given the socio-cultural context in which she was born and raised, her work is unique, not only because of the content of her writing per se but also because she produced and published her texts as a woman and in her native German dialect (Pennsilfaanisch Deitsch) in the United States.

Her will, only 30 words long, left her $855 estate to the Moravian Home for Aged Women in Lititz.

Education and professional life 
Louise A. Weitzel obtained her education at Sunnyside Kollitsch and at the Linden Hall Seminary for girls. Later she would work for local German-language newspapers where she ultimately found a vehicle to her voice as a poet. In 1908 she published the book A Quiver of Arrows: Poems by Louise A. Weitzel.

Religious life 
Louise A. Weitzel was an active member of the Herrnhuter Brüdergemeine/Moravian Church fellowship, a Christian reformist movement that preceded the German Protestant Martin Luther in Europe by more than a century, with the work initiated by John Huss and revived by Count Nicholas von Zinzendorf.

Poems 
Die Grummler

  
En deel Leit grummle immerhie,
Sie grumble Daag un Nacht.
Uff Gut's un Scheen's in daere Welt
Gewwe sie gar kee Acht.

Im Summer iss es gans zu hees,
Im Winter gans zu kalt;
Die Yunge sin yo gans zu yung, 
Die Alde gans zu alt.

Wann's reggert iss der Grund zu nass, 
Wann's drucke, zu voll Schtaab; 
Im Winter sin die Beem zu darr, 
Im Summer zu voll Laab.

Die schmaerde Leit sin gans zu schmaert, 
Die dumme gans zu dumm; 
Die Schtrosse sin aa gans zu graad, 
Die Leens sin gans zu grumm.

'S iss alles letz uff daere Welt, 
'S macht niemand gaar nix recht; 
Die Mensche traevle schtarck zu Hell, 
'S iss alles lass un schlecht.

So Mensche mache kee Mischteecks, 
Sie schtehne gans alle; 
Sie sehne annere Fehler, yuscht 
Ihr eegne duhn net seh.

– Louise A. Weitzel

 Bee
 Der Viert Tschulei
 Die Grummler
 Die Sunn scheint aryeds wo
 Mei Nochber hot en Reedio
 Nackich
 Vum Schiesse
 Siggaretts
 S Wedder
 Was meent's
 Wie zuvor
 Wu fehlt's
 Zu schtarrick

See also 

 Pennsylvania Dutch
 Moravian Church

References

External links 
 Hiwwe wie Driwwe (Hiwwe wie Driwwe: die pennsylvaanisch-deitsch Zeiding / The homepage of the Pennsylvania German newspaper.)
 The Pennsylvania German Society

1862 births
1934 deaths
Writers from Pennsylvania
19th-century American writers
Writers from Green Bay, Wisconsin
People from Lititz, Pennsylvania
American people of German descent
20th-century American writers
20th-century American women writers
19th-century American women writers